John Montagu, Marquess of Monthermer, 1st Baron Montagu of Boughton (18 March 1735 – 11 April 1770) was a British peer.

Life
He was born John Brudenell, the eldest son of George Brudenell, 4th Earl of Cardigan, by his wife Mary, daughter of John Montagu, 2nd Duke of Montagu. As heir-apparent to the Earldom of Cardigan, he was styled Lord Brudenell from birth.

In 1749 the Duke of Montagu died, and his son-in-law Lord Cardigan inherited his estates. He and his children duly adopted the surname Montagu in lieu of that of Brudenell. One of the Montagu family titles was revived in the person of Lord Brudenell when he was created Baron Montagu of Boughton, of Boughton in the county of Northampton, on 8 May 1762. The Earl of Cardigan was created first Duke of Montagu of the second creation on 5 November 1766, and his son assumed the courtesy title Marquess of Monthermer.

Prior to his elevation to the peerage, Lord Brudenell was briefly a Tory Member of Parliament for Marlborough, sitting for the borough along with his uncle Colonel Robert Brudenell. In 1764 his portrait was painted by Pompeo Batoni.

Lord Monthermer died on 11 April 1770 at the age of thirty-five, unmarried. As he left no children, his barony of Montagu became extinct, but was recreated for his father on 21 August 1786, with remainder to the younger sons of his sister Elizabeth, Duchess of Buccleuch.

References

1735 births
1770 deaths
Members of the Parliament of Great Britain for English constituencies
British courtesy marquesses
Heirs apparent who never acceded
John
Peers of Great Britain created by George III
Barons Montagu of Boughton